Shakti Thakur (1947 – 5 October 2020) was an Indian actor, comedian and playback singer. He has acted in many Bengali as well as several Hindi films and also lent his voice in films. His repertoire includes Yeh Desh (1984), Aagoon (1988), Sajanj Go Sajani (1994) etc.

Career
Thakur was a school teacher in his primary life. He later started his film career in 1976 with Tapan Sinha's "Harmonium" film as a playback singer. He, later on, starred in films like Dadar Kirti (1980) and Bhalobasha Bhalobasha. He was successful as an actor. He mostly played comedy roles in films.

Thakur was a classically trained singer. He sang songs under the baton of composers like Hemanta Mukhopadhyay, Ajoy Das and R. D. Burman etc. In 1984, he debuted in Bollywood when prominent composer R. D. Burman gave him a chance to sing a group song in Hindi film Yeh Desh alongside Kumar Sanu, Udit Narayan and Shailendra Singh. It was also the debut song of Kumar Sanu. After this, he lent his voice for many Bengali and Hindi films. In 1988, he sang a duet "Khali Pete Korle Bhojon" with veteran singer Kishore Kumar in a Bengali film Aagoon.

Personal life
Thakur has two daughters: Mehuli and Monali. His elder daughter Mehuli Thakur is a Rabindra Sangeet singer. His younger daughter Monali Thakur was a contestant at Indian Idol Season 2. She later went on to become a leading playback singer in Bengali  as well as Bollywood film industry. On his death, Monali shared a heartbroken note and cited that all she has become today is due to him.

Death
On 5 October 2020, Thakur died at the age of 73 following a massive heart attack. Many fellow actors and singers paid tribute to him.

References

1947 births
2020 deaths
Bengali playback singers
Bengali actors
Bollywood playback singers
Male actors in Hindi cinema
 Singers from West Bengal